Kailash Singh Rajput is an Indian politician and a member of 17th Legislative Assembly, Uttar Pradesh of India. He represents the ‘Tirwa’ constituency in Kannauj district of Uttar Pradesh.

Political career
Kailash Singh Rajput contested Uttar Pradesh Assembly Election as Bharatiya Janata Party candidate and defeated her close contestant Vijay Bahadur Pal from Samajwadi Party with a margin of 24,209 votes.

Posts held

References

Year of birth missing (living people)
Living people
Bharatiya Janata Party politicians from Uttar Pradesh
Uttar Pradesh MLAs 2017–2022
Uttar Pradesh MLAs 2022–2027